The smalleyed round stingray (Urotrygon microphthalmum) is a species of fish in the family Urotrygonidae. It is found in Brazil, French Guiana, Guyana, Suriname, and Venezuela. Its natural habitats are open seas and shallow seas.

References

Urotrygon
Taxonomy articles created by Polbot
Fish described in 1941